Polichna, or Polichne (Πολίχνη), was a town of ancient Megaris, mentioned by Homer, quoted by Strabo, for which the Athenians substituted another to prove that Salamis at the time of the Trojan War was a dependency of Athens.

References

Populated places in ancient Megaris
Former populated places in Greece
Lost ancient cities and towns